Sodium/potassium-transporting ATPase subunit alpha-2 is a protein which in humans is encoded by the ATP1A2 gene.

Function 

The protein encoded by this gene belongs to the family of P-type cation transport ATPases and to the subfamily of Na+/K+-ATPases. Na+/K+-ATPase is an integral membrane protein responsible for establishing and maintaining the electrochemical gradients of Na and K ions across the plasma membrane. These gradients are essential for osmoregulation, for sodium-coupled transport of a variety of organic and inorganic molecules, and for electrical excitability of nerve and muscle. This enzyme is composed of two subunits, a large catalytic subunit (alpha) and a smaller glycoprotein subunit (beta). The catalytic subunit of Na+/K+-ATPase is encoded by multiple genes. This gene encodes an alpha 2 subunit.

Clinical significance 

Mutations in ATP1A2 have been found to cause hemiplegic migraine and epilepsy in an autosomal dominant fashion, sometimes co-occurring in families. Additionally, it has been associated with an unusual form of migraine called alternating hemiplegia of childhood.

References

Further reading

External links 
 GeneReviews/NCBI/NIH/UW entry on Familial Hemiplegic Migraine